Oman first competed at the Asian Games in 1986.

Medal tables

Medals by Asian Games

List of medalists

Medals by sport

References